The 1988–89 FIBA European Champions Cup was the 32nd season of the European top-tier level professional FIBA European Champions Cup (now called EuroLeague), which was won by Jugoplastika, after they beat Maccabi Elite Tel Aviv 75-69. The culminating 1989 EuroLeague Final Four was held at Olympiahalle, Munich, West Germany, on 4–6 April 1989. Dino Rađja was named Final Four MVP.

Competition system

27 teams (European national domestic league champions only), playing in a tournament system, played knock-out rounds on a home and away basis. The aggregate score of both games decided the winner.
The eight remaining teams after the knock-out rounds entered a 1/4 Final Group Stage, which was played as a round-robin. The final standing was based on individual wins and defeats. In the case of a tie between two or more teams after the group stage, the following criteria were used to decide the final classification: 1) number of wins in one-to-one games between the teams; 2) basket average between the teams; 3) general basket average within the group.
The top four teams after the 1/4 Final Group Stage qualified for the Final Stage (Final Four), which was played at a predetermined venue.

First round

|}

Round of 16

|}

Quarterfinal round

Final four

Semifinals 
April 4, Olympiahalle, Munich

|}

3rd place game
April 6, Olympiahalle, Munich

|}

Final
April 6, Olympiahalle, Munich

|}

Final standings

Awards

FIBA European Champions Cup Final Four MVP
 Dino Rađa ( Jugoplastika)

FIBA European Champions Cup Finals Top Scorer
 Doron Jamchi ( Maccabi Elite Tel Aviv)

References

External links
1988–89 FIBA European Champions Cup
1988–89 FIBA European Champions Cup
Champions Cup 1988–89 Line-ups and Stats

FIBA
EuroLeague seasons